Nikolai Alexandrovich Berdyaev ( – 24 March 1948) was a Russian philosopher, theologian, and Christian existentialist who emphasized the existential spiritual significance of human freedom and the human person. Alternative historical spellings of his surname in English include "Berdiaev" and "Berdiaeff", and of his given name "Nicolas" and "Nicholas". Russian paleontologist and Christian apologist Alexander V. Khramov (Borissiak Paleontological Institute of the Russian Academy of Sciences, Ph.D. from Moscow University) attributes his ideas about an atemporal human fall to Berdyaev and Evgenii Nikolaevitch Troubetzkoy.

Biography

Nikolai Berdyaev was born at Obukhovo, Kiev Governorate (present-day Obukhiv, Ukraine) in 1874, in an aristocratic military family. His father, Alexander Mikhailovich Berdyaev, came from a long line of Russian nobility. Almost all of Alexander Mikhailovich's ancestors served as high-ranking military officers, but he resigned from the army quite early and became active in the social life of the aristocracy. Nikolai's mother, Alina Sergeevna Berdyaeva, was half-French and came from the top levels of both French and Russian nobility. He also had Polish and Tatar origins.

Berdyaev decided on an intellectual career and entered the Kiev University in 1894. It was a time of revolutionary fervor among the students and the intelligentsia. He became a Marxist for a period and was arrested in a student demonstration and expelled from the university. His involvement in illegal activities led in 1897 to three years of internal exile to Vologda in northern Russia.

A fiery 1913 article, entitled "Quenchers of the Spirit", criticising the rough purging of Imiaslavie Russian monks on Mount Athos by the Holy Synod of the Russian Orthodox Church using tsarist troops, caused him to be charged with the crime of blasphemy, the punishment for which was exile to Siberia for life. The World War and the Bolshevik Revolution prevented the matter coming to trial. 

Berdyaev's disaffection culminated, in 1919, with the foundation of his own private academy, the "Free Academy of Spiritual Culture". It was primarily a forum for him to lecture on the hot topics of the day and to present them from a Christian point of view. He also presented his opinions in public lectures, and every Tuesday, the academy hosted a meeting at his home because official Soviet anti-religious activity was intense at the time and the official policy of the Bolshevik government, with its Soviet anti-religious legislation, strongly promoted state atheism.

In 1920, Berdiaev became professor of philosophy at the University of Moscow. In the same year, he was accused of participating in a conspiracy against the government; he was arrested and jailed. The feared head of the Cheka, Felix Dzerzhinsky, came in person to interrogate him, and he gave his interrogator a solid dressing down on the problems with Bolshevism. Novelist Aleksandr Solzhenitsyn in his book The Gulag Archipelago recounts the incident as follows:
[Berdyaev] was arrested twice; he was taken in 1922 for a midnight interrogation with Dzerjinsky; Kamenev was also there.... But Berdyaev did not humiliate himself, he did not beg, he firmly professed the moral and religious principles by virtue of which he did not adhere to the party in power; and not only did they judge that there was no point in putting him on trial, but he was freed. Now there is a man who had a "point of view"!

After being expelled from Russia, Berdyaev and other émigrés went to Berlin, where he founded an academy of philosophy and religion, but economic and political conditions in the Weimar Republic caused him and his wife to move to Paris in 1923. He transferred his academy there, and taught, lectured and wrote, working for an exchange of ideas with the French and European intellectual community, and participated in a number of international conferences.

Philosophical work
According to Marko Markovic, Berdyaev "was an ardent man, rebellious to all authority, an independent and "negative" spirit. He could assert himself only in negation and could not hear any assertion without immediately negating it, to such an extent that he would even be able to contradict himself and to attack people who shared his own prior opinions". According to Marina Makienko, Anna Panamaryova, and Andrey Gurban, Berdyaev's works are "emotional, controversial, bombastic, affective and dogmatic". They summarise that, according to Berdyaev, "man unites two worlds – the world of the divine and the natural world. ... Through the freedom and creativity the two natures must unite... To overcome the dualism of existence is possible only through creativity.

David Bonner Richardson described Berdyaev's philosophy as Christian existentialism and personalism. Other authors, such as political theologian Tsoncho Tsonchev, interpret Berdyaev as "communitarian personalist" and Slavophile. According to Tsonchev, Berdyaev's philosophical thought rests on four "pillars": freedom, creativity, person, and communion. 

One of the central themes of Berdyaev's work was philosophy of love. At first he systematically developed his theory of love in a special article published in the journal Pereval in 1907. Then he gave gender issues a notable place in his book The Meaning of the Creative Act (1916). According to him, 1) erotic energy is an eternal source of creativity, 2) eroticism is linked to beauty, and eros means search for the beautiful.

He also published works about Russian history and the Russian national character. In particular, he wrote about Russian nationalism:

Theology and relations with Russian Orthodox Church
Berdyaev was a member of the Russian Orthodox Church, and believed Orthodoxy was the religious tradition closest to early Christianity.

Nicholas Berdyaev was an Orthodox Christian, however, it must be said that he was an independent and somewhat a "liberal" kind. Berdyaev also criticized the Russian Orthodox Church and described his views as anticlerical. Yet he considered himself closer to Orthodoxy than either Catholicism or Protestantism. According to him, "I can not call myself a typical Orthodox of any kind; but Orthodoxy was near to me (and I hope I am nearer to Orthodoxy) than either Catholicism or Protestantism. I never severed my link with the Orthodox Church, although confessional self-satisfaction and exclusiveness are alien to me."  

Berdyaev is frequently presented as one of the important Russian Orthodox thinkers of the 20th century. However, neopatristic scholars such as Florovsky have questioned whether his philosophy is essentially Orthodox in character, and emphasize his western influences. But Florovsky was savaged in a 1937 Journal Put' article by Berdyaev. Paul Valliere has pointed out the sociological factors and global trends which have shaped the Neopatristic movement, and questions their claim that Berdyaev and Vladimir Solovyov are somehow less authentically Orthodox.

Berdyaev affirmed universal salvation, as did several other important Orthodox theologians of the 20th century. Along with Sergei Bulgakov, he was instrumental in bringing renewed attention to the Orthodox doctrine of apokatastasis, which had largely been neglected since it was expounded by Maximus the Confessor in the seventh century, although he rejected Origen's articulation of this doctrine.

The aftermath of the Russian Revolution and Civil War, along with Soviet interference, caused the Russian Orthodox émigré diaspora to splinter into three Russian Church jurisdictions: the Russian Orthodox Church Outside Russia (separated from Moscow Patriarchate until 2007), the parishes under Metropolitan Eulogius (Georgiyevsky) that went under the Ecumenical Patriarchate of Constantinople, and parishes that remained under the Moscow Patriarchate. Berdyaev was among those that chose to remain under the omophorion of the Moscow Patriarchate. He is mentioned by name on the Korsun/Chersonese Diocesan history as among those noted figures who supported the Moscow Patriarchate West-European Eparchy (in France now Korsun eparchy).

Currently, the house in Clamart in which Berdyaev lived, now comprises a small "Berdiaev-museum" and attached Chapel in name of the Holy Spirit, under the omophorion of the Moscow Patriarchate. On 24 March 2018, the 70th anniversary of Berdyaev's death, the priest of the Chapel served panikhida-memorial prayer at the Diocesan cathedral for eternal memory of Berdyaev, and later that day the Diocesan bishop Nestor (Sirotenko) presided over prayer at the grave of Berdyaev.

Works
In 1901 Berdyaev opened his literary career so to speak by work on Subjectivism and Individualism in Social Philosophy. In it, he analyzed a movement then beginning in Imperial Russia that "at the beginning of the twentieth-century Russian Marxism split up; the more cultured Russian Marxists went through a spiritual crisis and became founders of an idealist and religious movement, while the majority began to prepare the advent of Communism". He wrote "over twenty books and dozens of articles."

The first date is of the Russian edition, the second date is of the first English edition
 Subjectivism and Individualism in Societal Philosophy (1901)
 The New Religious Consciousness and Society (1907) (includes chapter VI "The Metaphysics of Sex and Love")
Sub specie aeternitatis: Articles Philosophic, Social and Literary (1900-1906) (1907; 2019)  
Vekhi - Landmarks (1909; 1994) 
The Spiritual Crisis of the Intelligentsia (1910; 2014) 
The Philosophy of Freedom (1911; 2020)  
Aleksei Stepanovich Khomyakov (1912; 2017)   
 "Quenchers of the Spirit" (1913; 1999)
The Meaning of the Creative Act (1916; 1955) 
The Crisis of Art (1918; 2018)  
The Fate of Russia (1918; 2016) 
Dostoevsky: An Interpretation (1921; 1934) 
Oswald Spengler and the Decline of Europe (1922)
The Meaning of History (1923; 1936) 
The Philosophy of Inequality (1923; 2015) 
The End of Our Time [a.k.a. The New Middle Ages] (1924; 1933) 
Leontiev (1926; 1940)
Freedom and the Spirit (1927–8; 1935) 
The Russian Revolution (1931; anthology)
The Destiny of Man (1931; translated by Natalie Duddington 1937) 
Lev Shestov and Kierkegaard N. A. Beryaev 1936
Christianity and Class War (1931; 1933)
The Fate of Man in the Modern World (1934; 1935)
Solitude and Society (1934; 1938) 
The Bourgeois Mind (1934; anthology)
The Origin of Russian Communism (1937; 1955)
Christianity and Anti-semitism (1938; 1952)
Slavery and Freedom (1939) 
The Russian Idea (1946; 1947)
Spirit and Reality (1946; 1957) 
The Beginning and the End (1947; 1952) 
Towards a New Epoch" (1949; anthology)Dream and Reality: An Essay in Autobiography (1949; 1950) alternate title: Self-Knowledge: An Essay in Autobiography The Realm of Spirit and the Realm of Caesar (1949; 1952)
Divine and the Human (1949; 1952) 
 Truth and Revelation (n.p.; 1953)Astride the Abyss of War and Revolutions: Articles 1914-1922 (n.p.; 2017)  

 Sources
 '"Bibliographie des Oeuvres de Nicolas Berdiaev" établie par Tamara Klépinine' published by the Institut d'études Slaves, Paris 1978
 Berdyaev Bibliography on www.cherbucto.net
 By-Berdyaev Online Articles Index

See also

References

Sources
 
 
 
 
 
 
 
Donald A. Lowrie. Rebellious Prophet: A Life of Nicolai Berdyaev. Harper & Brothers, New York, 1960.
 
M. A. Vallon. An apostle of freedom: Life and teachings of Nicolas Berdyaev. Philosophical Library, New York, 1960.
Lesley Chamberlain. Lenin's Private War: The Voyage of the Philosophy Steamer and the Exile of the Intelligentsia. St. Martin's Press, New York, 2007.
Marko Marković, La Philosophie de l'inégalité et les idées politiques de Nicolas Berdiaev'' (Paris: Nouvelles Editions Latines, 1978).

Further reading

External links

 
 
 Berdyaev Online Library and Index
 Dirk H. Kelder's collection of Berdyaev essays and quotes
 Philosopher of Freedom 
 ISFP Gallery of Russian Thinkers: Nikolay Berdyaev
 Nikolai Berdiaev and Spiritual Freedom
 Fr. Aleksandr Men' Lecture on N. A. Berdyaev
 Odinblago.ru: Бердяев Николай Александрович (Russian)
 Korsun/Chersonese Eparchy (Russian and French language)

1874 births
1948 deaths
19th-century Christian mystics
19th-century Christian universalists
20th-century Christian mystics
20th-century Christian universalists
20th-century Russian philosophers
Anarchist writers
Christian anarchists
Christian existentialists
Christian universalist theologians
Eastern Orthodox mystics
Eastern Orthodox philosophers
Emigrants from the Russian Empire to France
Existentialist theologians
Liberals from the Russian Empire
Academic staff of Moscow State University
People from Kievsky Uyezd
People from Obukhiv
Russian anarchists
Russian Christian mystics
Russian memoirists
Russian nobility
Russian Orthodox Christians from Russia
Russian people of French descent
Russian people of Polish descent
Russian people of Tatar descent
Russian people of Ukrainian descent
Russian political writers
Soviet dissidents
Soviet expellees
Vekhovtsy
Philosophers of theodicy